Neil Howarth (born 15 November 1971) is an English football coach and former player. As a player, he played as a defender in the Football League with Macclesfield Town and Cheltenham Town.

Career
Howarth is a former Burnley, Macclesfield Town and cheltenham town player, who as captain led Macclesfield Town to two Conference National titles, in 1995 and 1997, to FA Trophy winners in 1996, and to the runner-up spot in Division Three in 1998. He joined Cheltenham Town in February 1999 for a fee of £10,000 and made over 140 appearances for the club in four-and-a-half seasons. helping them to the National Conference title in 1998–99. He left Cheltenham in 2003 when his contract was not renewed and joined Conference side Telford United where he spent two-and-a-half seasons.

In January 2006, he joined Kidderminster Harriers as assistant manager to Mark Yates and helped revive the club after relegation from the Football League in 2005. He signed a new two-year contract in June 2007, and a further one-year contract in May 2009. He left Kidderminster Harriers the same day as boss Mark Yates and joined Cheltenham Town firstly as first team coach before becoming Assistant Manager. He left the club in 2014.

References

External links
 
 

1971 births
Living people
English footballers
Footballers from Bolton
Association football defenders
English Football League players
Burnley F.C. players
Macclesfield Town F.C. players
Cheltenham Town F.C. players
Telford United F.C. players
Kidderminster Harriers F.C. players
England semi-pro international footballers
Cheltenham Town F.C. non-playing staff
Bury F.C. non-playing staff
Salford City F.C. non-playing staff
Macclesfield Town F.C. non-playing staff
English football managers
Macclesfield Town F.C. managers